Napoleon Brown Goodson Culp (October 12, 1929 – September 20, 2008) better known by his stage name Nappy Brown, was an American R&B singer. His hits include the 1955 Billboard chart No. 2 "Don't Be Angry", "Little By Little", and "Night Time Is the Right Time". His style was recognizable; Brown used a wide vibrato, melisma, and distinctive extra syllables, in particular, "li-li-li-li-li."

Biography
Brown was the son of Kathryn Culp and Sammie Lee Brown. After his mother died he was brought up by Fred and Maggie Culp. They attended Gethsemane AME Zion Church and he attended school in Charlotte, North Carolina.

Early career
He began his career singing gospel music before switching to R&B.  In 1954 he won a recording contract with Savoy Records, which yielded a series of hits, including "Don't Be Angry" (No. 2 R&B, No. 25 pop, 1955), "Pitter Patter" (No. 10 R&B, 1955), "Little By Little" (No. 57 pop, 1956), and "It Don't Hurt No More" (No. 8 R&B, No. 89 pop, 1958).  Brown was among the biggest stars in R&B, frequently touring with the revues of Alan Freed.

His songs, along with those of his peers and contemporaries (such as Little Richard, Chuck Berry, and Fats Domino), were among the first wave of African-American pop music to become noticed and popular with white audiences. Elvis Presley reportedly used to see Brown perform whenever he appeared in Memphis. In addition to Brown's influence on blues music, and 1950s R&B and pop, Brown's powerful and protean voice, combined with his distinctive emotive style, is widely viewed as a key link in the development of soul music.

1980s comeback
In the early 1980s, a renewed interest in R&B led to some of Brown's early songs being released on European albums. At the urging of Bob Margolin, former guitarist for Muddy Waters's band and a fan of Brown, Brown returned to the music industry, beginning with a successful tour of Scandinavia in 1983. In 1984, 14 years since his last recording, Brown signed with Landslide Records and released the album Tore Up with The Heartfixers. Other recordings followed.

Brown's Savoy Records hit, "Piddly Patter" was featured in the John Waters film, Cry-Baby, starring Johnny Depp.

Later life
Nappy Brown's final album, Long Time Coming, recorded in May 2007, on Blind Pig Records, was released on September 25, 2007. Reviews were positive; the album and Brown were each nominated for a Blues Music Award. The album, produced by Scott Cable, featured the guitarists Sean Costello, Bob Margolin, Junior Watson, and other special guests performing Brown's hits and several new songs. In the fall of 2007, Nappy Brown was Living Blues magazine's September cover artist, and followed that honor with a European tour. Brown was a musical guest on Garrison Keillor's Prairie Home Companion on October 20, 2007.

At the ceremony for the Blues Music Awards in May 2008, Brown gave one last electrifying performance, capping an incredible comeback year.

On June 1, 2008 following a performance at the Crawfish Festival in Augusta, New Jersey, Brown fell ill due to series of ailments and was hospitalized. He died in his sleep on September 20, 2008 at Mercy Hospital in Charlotte, North Carolina.

Brown was inducted into the Blues Hall of Fame on August 24, 2002.

Nappy Brown's 1956 recording of "Open Up That Door", is featured in a national commercial for Google, as of June 2020.

Recordings
Roots To Scandinavian Blues (LP 1983/remastered 2009) with Knut Reiersrud guitar. Hot Club Records/Jon Larsen. Nappy Brown and The Electric City band. "Who's Been Fooling You"  [1997/ new moon music]

Discography

Albums
 Thanks For Nothing 1969
 Yes, I Know The Man 1974
 When I Get Inside 1977
 Tore Up 1984
 Don't Be Angry! 1984
 Something Gonna Jump Out The Bushes! 1987
 Deep Sea Diver 1989
 Apples & Lemons 1990
 Aw! Shucks 1991
 I'm A Wild Man 1994
 Just For Me 1996
 Who's Been Foolin' You" 1997
 Best Of Both Worlds 1998
 Long Time Coming 2007

Singles

References

External links
The new album: Long Time Coming
[ The album's 4-1/2 star review] from Allmusic
Prairie Home Companion, Oct 20, 2007 -- with Nappy Brown
Nappy Brown's Myspace page
An audio review of the new album, Long Time Coming from the WXPN blues show podcast
Some reviews ofLong Time Coming''
Blind Pig Records news
Artist profile, from Piedmont Talent
Blues Hall of Fame

1929 births
2008 deaths
American rhythm and blues singers
American blues singers
American male composers
20th-century American composers
American soul musicians
American male singer-songwriters
American blues singer-songwriters
20th-century African-American male singers
Black Top Records artists
Savoy Records artists
Jump blues musicians
Musicians from Charlotte, North Carolina
Blind Pig Records artists
African-American songwriters
Singer-songwriters from North Carolina